Jean Howell (November 21, 1927 – July 23, 1996) was an American television actress. She also appeared occasionally in films.

Howell was the daughter of  Burl Howell and Esther Hyde ‘’Buddy’’ Howell, along with her sister Dixon and graduated from Analy High School in 1944. She also graduated from the University of Washington.

On stage, Howell acted in New York in summer stock theater and at the Horseshoe Theater in Los Angeles. Television programs on which she appeared included Armstrong Circle Theatre, Four Star Theater, Lux Video Theatre, and Telephone Time. Her films included the 1957 western Hell's Crossroads.

Howell was married to actor Larry Thor for four months in 1956.

In her later years, Howell was an advocate for environmental efforts to clean up Santa Monica Bay. She both gave talks about ecology and trained speakers for similar activities.

Howell died of cancer on July 23, 1996, in Santa Monica, California. She was 68.

Selected filmography
 The Fast and the Furious (1955)
 Apache Woman (1955)
 Hell's Crossroads (1957)
 The Restless Gun (1958) Episode "Friend in Need"
 Who'll Stop the Rain (1978)

References

External links
 

1927 births
1996 deaths
American film actresses
American television actresses
20th-century American actresses
American stage actresses
University of Washington alumni
People from Pomona, California
Actresses from California